The Independent Church of French Polynesia was founded in the 1940s when a single parish of Afahaati refused to move its pastor to another congregation. It is pastored now by Rev. Jean-Pierre Aumeran. The single church has about 100 members. It is a Reformed church.

References 

Reformed church buildings
Churches in New Caledonia